Red velvet cake is traditionally a red, crimson, or scarlet-colored layer cake, layered with ermine icing. Traditional recipes do not use food coloring, with the red color due to non-Dutched, anthocyanin-rich cocoa.

Common ingredients include buttermilk, butter, cocoa, vinegar, and flour. Beet juice or red food coloring may be used for the color.

History 
In the 19th century, "velvet" cake, a soft and velvety crumb cake, came to be served as a fancy dessert, in contrast to what had been the more common, coarser-crumbed cake. Around the turn of the 20th century, devil's food cake was introduced, which is how some believe that red velvet cake came about. The key difference between the two cakes is that devil's food cake uses chocolate and red velvet cake uses cocoa.

Adams Extract is credited with bringing the red velvet cake to kitchens across America during the Great Depression era, by being one of the first to sell red food coloring and other flavor extracts with the use of point-of-sale posters and tear-off recipe cards. When foods were rationed in the US during World War II, bakers used boiled beet juices to enhance the color of their cakes. Beet was and is used in some recipes as a filler or to retain moisture. The cake and its original recipe are well known in the United States from New York City's famous Waldorf-Astoria Hotel, which has been dubbed the confection Waldorf-Astoria cake. However, it is widely considered a Southern recipe. Traditionally, red velvet cake is iced with a French-style butter ermine icing (also called roux icing though, while containing butter and flour, it is not made from a roux), which is very light and fluffy, but time-consuming to prepare. Cream cheese frosting and buttercream frosting are variations that have increased in popularity.

Red velvet cake may also have roots in black foodways and is sometimes considered to be soul food in the South. The color red is often used in Juneteenth celebrations to symbolize bloodshed in the fight against slavery. It is also used to remember the lives of Black ancestors before emancipation, as it honors those who did not have the opportunity to taste the freedoms of today. 

In general, red foods and red drinks typically consumed during Juneteenth have links to kola nuts and hibiscus, two West African foods. In the Yoruba and Kongo heritages of West Africa, things of red colors symbolize divine spiritual powers. The practice of eating red foods during Juneteenth may have originated from enslaved individuals being brought over to America from the Yoruba and Kongo cultures, who infusing their culinary traditions into their food practices in America. However, red velvet cake in particular was only introduced in the 1930s when red food dye was developed. Since then, red velvet cake became part of African-American home cooking.

Nicole Taylor, a cookbook author, described red velvet cake as a staple that only came out in Atlanta during special occasions, such as Christmas, Juneteenth, and other big celebrations. The color red also symbolizes joy, which explains its use as a celebration cake today in black communities. Many experts consider the cake to have origins in 1911 when Rufus Estes, a formerly enslaved person and chef, incorporated a recipe for a sweet velvet cake in his cookbook. However, the infusion of the color red into these cakes is a more recent innovation. Therefore, there is debate over whether red velvet cake is truly considered soul food, as historians and culinary experts disagree about whether red cake in particular should be part of black food history.

In Canada, the cake was a well-known dessert in the restaurants and bakeries of the Eaton's department store chain in the 1940s and 1950s. Promoted as an exclusive Eaton's recipe, with employees who knew the recipe sworn to silence, many mistakenly believed the cake was the invention of the department store matriarch, Lady Eaton.

In recent years, red velvet cake and red velvet cupcakes have become increasingly popular in the US and many European countries, especially around Christmas and more recently Valentine's Day. A resurgence in the popularity of this cake is attributed by some to the 1989 film Steel Magnolias, which included a red velvet groom's cake made in the shape of an armadillo.

Ingredients 
Ingredients vary based on the era and area of the world. James Beard's reference, American Cookery (1972), describes three red velvet cakes varying in the amounts of shortening, butter, and vegetable oil. All used red food coloring. The reaction of acidic vinegar and buttermilk tends to better reveal the red anthocyanin in cocoa and keeps the cake moist, light, and fluffy. This natural tinting may have been the source for the name "red velvet", as well as "Devil's food" and similar names for chocolate cakes. Today, chocolate often undergoes Dutch processing, which prevents the color change of the anthocyanins. A reconstruction of the original red velvet cake involves reducing or eliminating the vinegar and colorants and using a non-Dutched cocoa to provide the needed acidity and color.

Variations 
In addition to the many variations of red velvet cake, there are various red velvet-flavored products, including protein powder, tea, lattes, Pop-Tarts, waffles, and alcoholic beverages. The scent is used for candles and air fresheners as well.   For dietary restrictions, such as those due to allergies and ingredient sensitivity, vegan, gluten-free, and dairy-free variations are available.

References

External links 
 

Chocolate desserts
Cuisine of the Southern United States
Eaton's
Christmas cakes
American cakes
Chocolate cakes
Valentine's Day
Maryland cuisine